Fenner's is Cambridge University Cricket Club's ground.

History
Cambridge University Cricket Club had previously played at two grounds in Cambridge, the University Ground and Parker's Piece. In 1846, Francis Fenner leased a former cherry orchard from Gonville and Caius College for the purpose of constructing a cricket ground. In 1848 he sub-let the ground to Cambridge University Cricket Club. Fenner's first hosted first-class cricket in 1848, with Cambridge University playing against the Marylebone Cricket Club (MCC).

A 40-foot wooden pavilion, painted blue, with a slated roof had been erected by the 1856 season.

Fenner's is also home to the Cambridge MCC University side, a partnership between the University of Cambridge, Anglia Ruskin University and the Marylebone Cricket Club established ahead of the 2010 season.

Facilities
As well as the cricket ground, there is a 3-lane indoor cricket school.

The groundsman pioneered the art of mowing grass in strips to create patterns, a technique now common in sports stadiums around the world.

See also 
 The Parks, where first-class cricket is played in Oxford
 University Ground, Barnwell, a former Cambridge University cricket ground

References

External links 

 Fenner's home page
 Matches played at Fenner's from CricketArchive
 Ground profile from Cricinfo
 Cambridge University Cricket Club

1848 establishments in England
Cricket grounds in Cambridgeshire
Sport at the University of Cambridge
University of Cambridge sites
Sports venues in Cambridge
Parks and open spaces in Cambridge
Sports venues completed in 1848
University sports venues in the United Kingdom